Salumá is a Carib language of Brazil.

References

Languages of Brazil
Cariban languages